The E7 was a , A1A-A1A passenger train locomotive built by General Motors' Electro-Motive Division of La Grange, Illinois. 428 cab versions, or E7As, were built from February 1945 to April 1949; 82 booster E7Bs were built from March 1945 to July 1948. (Circa 1953 one more E7A was built by the Los Angeles General Shops of the Southern Pacific by rebuilding an E2A.) The 2,000 hp came from two 12 cylinder model 567A engines. Each engine drove its own electrical generator to power the two traction motors on one truck. The E7 was the eighth model in a line of passenger diesels of similar design known as EMD E-units, and it became the best selling E model upon its introduction.

In profile the front of the nose of an E7A was less slanted than on earlier EMD passenger locomotives, and the E7, E8, and E9 units have been nicknamed “bulldog nose” units. Some earlier units were called “shovel nose” units or “slant nose” units.

In film
A Gulf, Mobile and Ohio Railroad E7A, #103-A, appears at the start and end of the 1967 film In The Heat of the Night.

A Southern Pacific E7A, #6001, is on the point of a train that figures prominently in "The Hitch-Hiker", a popular 1960 episode of the anthology television series, The Twilight Zone, starring Inger Stevens. (According to the narration, Steven's character is said to encounter the train somewhere between Pennsylvania and Tennessee, yet the locomotive's number board shows that the train, #99, is the Coast Daylight, which travelled between Los Angeles and San Francisco.)

Surviving example
Ex-Pennsylvania Railroad E7A #5901 is preserved as the only surviving example of the E7. This locomotive has been cosmetically restored, and is currently on indoor display at the Railroad Museum of Pennsylvania, in Strasburg, Pennsylvania.

Original owners

See also 

List of GM-EMD locomotives

References

External links

 
 
 Railroad Museum of Pennsylvania – #5901 page (Archive of Webpage here.)

A1A-A1A locomotives
E7
Passenger locomotives
Diesel-electric locomotives of the United States
Railway locomotives introduced in 1945
Locomotives with cabless variants
Standard gauge locomotives of the United States
Streamlined diesel locomotives